The 2004–05 season was Paris Saint-Germain's 35th season in existence. PSG played their home league games at the Parc des Princes in Paris, registering an average attendance of 35,369 spectators per match. The club was presided by Francis Graille until 2 May 2005, when Pierre Blayau became the new president. The team was coached by Vahid Halilhodžić until 8 February 2005, when Laurent Fournier replaced him. José-Karl Pierre-Fanfan was the team captain.

Season summary
The season before, PSG had won the Coupe de France and finished second in Ligue 1, just three points away from title glory. However, manager Vahid Halilhodžić's second season at the club was not a success. From their opening Champions League group stage 0–3 home loss to Chelsea, to their poor domestic form, PSG never looked like replicating the winning form of the previous season. Going into the final round of Champions League group stage fixtures in December, the team still had a chance of advancing to the knockout stage. The club, however, suffered a disappointing 1–3 defeat at home, courtesy of a Sergei Semak hat-trick, which meant straight elimination from Europe. It was a bitter loss that even prompted club president Francis Graille to publicly relay his disappointment at the "lack of pride" shown by the squad, though remaining guardedly coy when explicitly asked about Halilhodžić's future at the club.

With only domestic competition to worry about, PSG began 2005 looking to improve its league standing. Sluggish form continued, however, and on 8 February, following a 2–0 home defeat versus Lens that saw PSG drop to 12th, the club's management decided to sack Halilhodžić. He was replaced by the coach of the reserves team, Laurent Fournier, under whom the club eventually finished ninth in the league.

Following the conclusion of the season, Sochaux's Guy Lacombe was appointed as manager.

Players

As of the 2004–05 season.

Squad

Left club during season

Competitions

Overview

Trophée des Champions

Ligue 1

League table

Results summary

Results by match

Matches

Coupe de France

Coupe de la Ligue

UEFA Champions League

Group stage

Notes and references

Notes

References

External links

Official websites
PSG.FR - Site officiel du Paris Saint-Germain
Paris Saint-Germain - Ligue 1 
Paris Saint-Germain - UEFA.com

Paris Saint-Germain F.C. seasons
Paris Saint-Germain